Cacoplistes is the type genus of cricket in the subfamily Cachoplistinae; it has been placed in its own tribe, the Cachoplistini.  Its recorded distribution is: India, southern China and Indo-China.

Species
The Orthoptera Species File lists:
subgenus Cacoplistes Brunner von Wattenwyl, 1873
Cacoplistes brunnerianus Saussure, 1877 - type species
Cacoplistes indicus Chopard, 1935
Cacoplistes proximus Gorochov, 2003
subgenus Laminogryllus Gorochov, 2003
Cacoplistes brevisparamerus Wang, Zhang, Wei & Liu, 2017
Cacoplistes choui Liu & Shi, 2012
Cacoplistes derelictus Gorochov, 2003
Cacoplistes rogenhoferi Saussure, 1877
Cacoplistes westwoodianus Saussure, 1877

References

External links
 

Ensifera genera
crickets
Orthoptera of Asia
Orthoptera of Indo-China